Jean-David Morvan (born 28 November 1969 in Reims, Marne, France) is a French comics author.

Morvan  studied arts at the Institut Saint-Luc in Brussels. Morvan started out as a comics artist, but soon realised that his true strength is storytelling, and so now he is best known as a comics writer. He resides in Reims, France.

His main series are Spirou et Fantasio, Sir Pyle and Merlin, all with José Luis Munuera, and Wake with Philippe Buchet. He has published more than 230 comics to date.

Awards
 2002: nominated for the Youth Award (9-12 years) at the Angoulême International Comics Festival, France
 2004: nominated for the Youth Award (9–12 years) at the Angoulême International Comics Festival
 2006: Youth Award (9–12 years) at the Angoulême International Comics Festival
 Νominated for Best Youth Comic at the Prix Saint-Michel, Brussels, Belgium
 2007: Best Youth Comic at the Prix Saint-Michel
 2008: nominated for Best Story at the Prix Saint-Michel

Notes

1969 births
Living people
Writers from Reims
French comics writers
Spirou et Fantasio
French male writers